K2, at  above sea level, is the second-highest mountain on Earth, after Mount Everest (at ). It lies in the Karakoram range, partially in the Gilgit-Baltistan region of Pakistan-administered Kashmir and partially in a China-administered territory Trans-Karakoram Tract included in the Taxkorgan Tajik Autonomous County of Xinjiang.

K2 also became popularly known as the Savage Mountain after George Bell—a climber on the 1953 American expedition—told reporters, "It's a savage mountain that tries to kill you." Of the five highest mountains in the world, K2 is the deadliest; approximately one person dies on the mountain for every four who reach the summit. Also occasionally known as Mount Godwin-Austen, other nicknames for K2 are The King of Mountains and The Mountaineers' Mountain, as well as The Mountain of Mountains after prominent Italian climber Reinhold Messner titled his book about K2 the same.

The summit was reached for the first time by the Italian climbers Lino Lacedelli and Achille Compagnoni, on the 1954 Italian expedition led by Ardito Desio. In January 2021, K2 became the final eight-thousander to be summited in the winter; the mountaineering feat was accomplished by a team of Nepalese climbers, led by Nirmal Purja and Mingma Gyalje Sherpa.

K2 is the only  peak that has never been climbed from its eastern face. Ascents have almost always been made in July and August, which are typically the warmest times of the year; K2's more northern location makes it more susceptible to inclement and colder weather. The peak has now been climbed by almost all of its ridges. Although the summit of Everest is at a higher altitude, K2 is a more difficult and dangerous climb, due in part to its more inclement weather. , only 377 people have completed the ascent to its summit. There have been 91 deaths during attempted climbs.

Name 

The name K2 is derived from notation used by the Great Trigonometrical Survey of British India.

The policy of the Great Trigonometrical Survey was to use local names for mountains wherever possible and K1 was found to be known locally as Masherbrum. K2, however, appeared not to have acquired a local name, possibly due to its remoteness. The mountain is not visible from Askole, one of the highest settlements on the way to the mountain, nor from the nearest habitation to the north. K2 is only fleetingly glimpsed from the end of the Baltoro Glacier, beyond which few local people would have ventured. The name Chogori, derived from two Balti words, chhogo ཆོ་གྷའོ་ ("big") and ri རི  ("mountain") (چھوغوری) has been suggested as a local name, but evidence for its widespread use is scant. It may have been a compound name invented by Western explorers or simply a bemused reply to the question "What's that called?" It does, however, form the basis for the name Qogir by which Chinese authorities officially refer to the peak. Other local names have been suggested including Lamba Pahar ("Tall Mountain" in Urdu) and Dapsang, but are not widely used.

With the mountain lacking a local name, the name Mount Godwin-Austen was suggested, in honour of Henry Godwin-Austen, an early explorer of the area. While the name was rejected by the Royal Geographical Society, it was used on several maps and continues to be used occasionally.

The surveyor's mark, K2, therefore continues to be the name by which the mountain is commonly known. It is now also used in the Balti language, rendered as Kechu or KetuCarter, op cit. Carter notes a generalisation of the word Ketu: "A new word, ketu, meaning 'big peak', seems to be entering the Balti language.". The Italian climber Fosco Maraini argued in his account of the ascent of Gasherbrum IV that while the name of K2 owes its origin to chance, its clipped, impersonal nature is highly appropriate for so remote and challenging a mountain. He concluded that it was:

André Weil named K3 surfaces in mathematics partly after the beauty of the mountain K2.

Geographical setting

K2 lies in the northwestern Karakoram Range. It is located in the Baltistan region of Gilgit–Baltistan, Pakistan, and the Taxkorgan Tajik Autonomous County of Xinjiang, China. The Tarim sedimentary basin borders the range on the north and the Lesser Himalayas on the south. Melt waters from glaciers, such as those south and east of K2, feed agriculture in the valleys and contribute significantly to the regional fresh-water supply.

K2 is ranked 22nd by topographic prominence, a measure of a mountain's independent stature. Many other peaks far lower than K2 are more independent in this sense. It is, however, the most prominent peak within the Karakoram range.

K2 is notable for its local relief as well as its total height. It is a consistently steep pyramid, dropping quickly in almost all directions.

A 1986 expedition led by George Wallerstein made an inaccurate measurement showing that K2 was taller than Mount Everest, and therefore the tallest mountain in the world. A corrected measurement was made in 1987, but by then the claim that K2 was the tallest mountain in the world had already made it into many news reports and reference works.

Height
In the summer of 2014, a Pakistani-Italian expedition to K2, named "K2 60 Years Later", was organized to commemorate the 60th anniversary of the first ascent of K2. One of the goals of the expedition was to accurately measure the height of the mountain using satellite navigation.

Geology
The mountains of K2 and Broad Peak, and the area westward to the lower reaches of Sarpo Laggo glacier, consist of metamorphic rocks, known as the K2 Gneiss, and part of the Karakoram Metamorphic Complex. The K2 Gneiss consists of a mixture of orthogneiss and biotite-rich paragneiss. On the south and southeast face of K2, the orthogneiss consists of a mixture of a strongly foliated plagioclase-hornblende gneiss and a biotite-hornblende-K-feldspar orthogneiss, which has been intruded by garnet-mica leucogranitic dikes. In places, the paragneisses include clinopyroxene-hornblende-bearing psammites, garnet (grossular)-diopside marbles, and biotite-graphite phyllites. Near the memorial to the climbers who have died on K2, above Base Camp on the south spur, thin impure marbles with quartzites and mica schists, called the Gilkey-Puchoz sequence, are interbanded within the orthogneisses. On the west face of Broad Peak and south spur of K2, lamprophyre dikes, which consist of clinopyroxene and biotite-porphyritic vogesites and minettes, have intruded the K2 gneiss. The K2 Gneiss is separated from the surrounding sedimentary and metasedimentary rocks of the surrounding Karakoram Metamorphic Complex by normal faults. For example, a fault separates the K2 gneiss of the east face of K2 from limestones and slates comprising nearby Skyang Kangri.

40Ar/39Ar ages of 115 to 120 million years ago obtained from and geochemical analyses of the K2 Gneiss demonstrate that it is a metamorphosed, older, Cretaceous, pre-collisional granite. The granitic precursor (protolith) to the K2 Gneiss originated as the result of the production of large bodies of magma by a northward-dipping subduction zone along what was the continental margin of Asia at that time and their intrusion as batholiths into its lower continental crust. Later, the K2 Gneiss was then intruded by leucogranite dikes and finally exhumed and uplifted along major breakback thrust faults during post-Miocene time. The K2 Gneiss was exposed as the entire K2-Broad Peak-Gasherbrum range experienced rapid uplift with which erosion rates have been unable to keep pace.

Climbing history
Early attempts

The mountain was first surveyed by a British team in 1856. Team member Thomas Montgomerie designated the mountain "K2" for being the second peak of the Karakoram range. The other peaks were originally named K1, K3, K4, and K5, but were eventually renamed Masherbrum, Gasherbrum IV, Gasherbrum II, and Gasherbrum I, respectively. In 1892, Martin Conway led a British expedition that reached "Concordia" on the Baltoro Glacier.

The first serious attempt to climb K2 was undertaken in 1902 by Oscar Eckenstein, Aleister Crowley, Jules Jacot-Guillarmod, Heinrich Pfannl, Victor Wessely, and Guy Knowles via the Northeast Ridge. In the early 1900s, modern transportation did not exist in the region: it took "fourteen days just to reach the foot of the mountain".
After five serious and costly attempts, the team reached —although considering the difficulty of the challenge, and the lack of modern climbing equipment or weatherproof fabrics, Crowley's statement that "neither man nor beast was injured" highlights the relative skill of the ascent. The failures were also attributed to sickness (Crowley was suffering the residual effects of malaria), a combination of questionable physical training, personality conflicts, and poor weather conditions—of 68 days spent on K2 (at the time, the record for the longest time spent at such an altitude) only eight provided clear weather.

This would eventually become part of the standard route, but was abandoned at the time due to its steepness and difficulty. After trying and failing to find a feasible alternative route on the West Ridge or the North East Ridge, the Duke declared that K2 would never be climbed, and the team switched its attention to Chogolisa, where the Duke came within  of the summit before being driven back by a storm.

The next attempt on K2 was not made until 1938, when the First American Karakoram expedition led by Charles Houston made a reconnaissance of the mountain. They concluded that the Abruzzi Spur was the most practical route and reached a height of around  before turning back due to diminishing supplies and the threat of bad weather.Curran, pp.73–80

The following year, the 1939 American expedition led by Fritz Wiessner came within  of the summit but ended in disaster when Dudley Wolfe, Pasang Kikuli, Pasang Kitar, and Pintso disappeared high on the mountain.Curran pp. 81–94

Charles Houston returned to K2 to lead the 1953 American expedition. A desperate retreat followed, during which Pete Schoening saved almost the entire team during a mass fall (known simply as The Belay), and Gilkey was killed, either in an avalanche or in a deliberate attempt to avoid burdening his companions. Despite the retreat and tragic end, the expedition has been given iconic status in mountaineering history.McDonald, pp. 119–140 The Gilkey Memorial was built in his memory at the mountain's foot.

Success and repeats

The 1954 Italian expedition finally succeeded in ascending to the summit of K2 via the Abruzzi Spur on 31 July 1954. The expedition was led by Ardito Desio, and the two climbers who reached the summit were Lino Lacedelli and Achille Compagnoni. The team included a Pakistani member, Colonel Muhammad Ata-ullah, who had been a part of the 1953 American expedition. The ascent is controversial because Lacedelli and Compagnoni established their camp at a higher elevation than originally agreed with Mehdi and Bonatti. It being too dark to ascend or descend, Mehdi and Bonatti were forced to overnight without shelter above  leaving the oxygen tanks behind as requested when they descended. Bonatti and Mehdi survived, but Mehdi was hospitalised for months and had to have his toes amputated because of frostbite. Efforts in the 1950s to suppress these facts to protect Lacedelli and Compagnoni's reputations as Italian national heroes were later brought to light. It was also revealed that the moving of the camp was deliberate, a move apparently made because Compagnoni feared being outshone by the younger Bonatti. Bonatti was given the blame for Mehdi's hospitalisation.

On 9 August 1977, 23 years after the Italian expedition, Ichiro Yoshizawa led the second successful ascent, with Ashraf Aman as the first native Pakistani climber. The Japanese expedition took the Abruzzi Spur and used more than 1,500 porters.

The third ascent of K2 was in 1978, via a new route, the long and corniced Northeast Ridge. The top of the route traversed left across the East Face to avoid a vertical headwall and joined the uppermost part of the Abruzzi route. This ascent was made by an American team, led by James Whittaker; the summit party was Louis Reichardt, Jim Wickwire, John Roskelley, and Rick Ridgeway. This ascent was emotional for the American team, as they saw themselves as completing a task that had been begun by the 1938 team forty years earlier.

Another notable Japanese ascent was that of the difficult North Ridge on the Chinese side of the peak in 1982. A team from the  led by Isao Shinkai and  put three members, Naoe Sakashita, Hiroshi Yoshino, and Yukihiro Yanagisawa, on the summit on 14 August. However Yanagisawa fell and died on the descent. Four other members of the team achieved the summit the next day.

The first climber to reach the summit of K2 twice was Czech climber Josef Rakoncaj. Rakoncaj was a member of the 1983 Italian expedition led by Francesco Santon, which made the second successful ascent of the North Ridge (31 July 1983). Three years later, on 5 July 1986, he reached the summit via the Abruzzi Spur (double with Broad Peak West Face solo) as a member of Agostino da Polenza's international expedition.

The first woman to summit K2 was Polish climber Wanda Rutkiewicz on 23 June 1986. Liliane and Maurice Barrard who had summitted later that day, fell during the descent; Liliane Barrard's body was found on 19 July 1986 at the foot of the south face.

In 1986, two Polish expeditions summitted via two new routes, the Magic Line and the Polish Line (Jerzy Kukuczka and Tadeusz Piotrowski). Piotrowski fell to his death as the two were descending. This latter route has never been repeated.

Thirteen climbers from several expeditions died in the 1986 K2 disaster. Another six mountaineers died in the 1995 K2 disaster, while eleven climbers died in the 2008 K2 disaster.

Recent attempts

2004
In 2004, the Spanish climber Carlos Soria Fontán became the oldest person ever to summit K2, at the age of 65.
2008
 On 1 August 2008, a group of climbers went missing after a large piece of ice fell during an avalanche, taking out the fixed ropes on part of the route; four climbers were rescued, but 11, including Meherban Karim from Pakistan and Ger McDonnell, the first Irish person to reach the summit, were confirmed dead.
2009
 Despite several attempts, nobody reached the summit.
2010
 On 6 August 2010, Fredrik Ericsson, who intended to ski from the summit, joined Gerlinde Kaltenbrunner on the way to the summit of K2. Ericsson fell  and was killed. Kaltenbrunner aborted her summit attempt.
Despite several attempts, nobody reached the summit.
2011
 On 23 August 2011, a team of four climbers reached the summit of K2 from the North side. Gerlinde Kaltenbrunner became the first woman to complete all 14 eight-thousanders without supplemental oxygen. Kazakhs Maxut Zhumayev and Vassiliy Pivtsov completed their eight-thousanders quest. The fourth team member was Dariusz Załuski from Poland.
2012
 The year started with a Russian team aiming for a first winter ascent. The expedition ended with the death of Vitaly Gorelik due to frostbite and pneumonia. The Russian team cancelled the ascent. In the summer season, K2 saw a record crowd standing on its summit—28 climbers in a single day—bringing the total for the year to 30.
2013
 On 28 July 2013, two New Zealanders, Marty Schmidt and his son Denali, died after an avalanche destroyed their camp. A guide had reached their camp, but said they were nowhere to be seen and the campsite tent showed signs of having been hit by an avalanche. British climber Adrian Hayes, who was with the group, later posted on his Facebook page that the campsite had been wiped out.
2014
 On 26 July 2014, the first team of Pakistani climbers scaled K2. There were six Pakistani and three Italian climbers in the expedition, called K2 60 Years Later, according to BBC. Previously, K2 had only been summitted by individual Pakistanis as part of international expeditions. Another team, consisting of Pasang Lhamu Sherpa Akita, Maya Sherpa, and Dawa Yangzum Sherpa, became the first Nepali women to climb K2.
On 27 July 2014, Garrett Madison led a team of three American climbers and six Sherpas to summit K2.
 On 31 July 2014, Boyan Petrov completed the first Bulgarian ascent, just 8 days after climbing Broad Peak. Boyan is among the very few climbers with diabetes to climb above  without the use of supplemental oxygen.
2017
 On 28 July 2017, Vanessa O'Brien led an international team of 12 with Mingma Gyalje Sherpa of Dreamers Destination to the summit of K2 and became the first British and American woman to summit K2, and the eldest woman to summit K2 at the age of 52 years old. She paid tribute to Julie Tullis and Alison Hargreaves, two British women who summited K2, in 1986 and 1995 respectively, but died during their descents. Other notable summits included John Snorri Sigurjónsson and Dawa Gyalje Sherpa who joined his sister (Dawa Yangzum Sherpa), becoming the second set of siblings to summit K2. Both Mingma Gyalje Sherpa and Fazal Ali recorded their second K2 summits.
2018
On 22 July 2018, Garrett Madison became the first American climber to reach the summit of K2 more than once when he led an international team of eight climbers, nine Nepali Sherpas, four Pakistani high altitude porters, and two other Madison Mountaineering guides to the summit.
On 22 July 2018, Polish mountaineer and mountain runner Andrzej Bargiel became the first person to ski down from summit to base camp.
2019
On 25 July 2019, Anja Blacha became the first German woman to summit K2. She climbed without the use of supplemental oxygen.
2022
On 22 July 2022 more than 100 summits on K2 in a single day have been recorded. This is the highest number of summits in a single day ever on K2.

Winter expeditions
Hurricane winds and frostbite forced the team to retreat.
 2002/2003 — Netia K2 Polish Winter Expedition. The team of fourteen climbers was led by Krzysztof Wielicki, and included four members from Kazakhstan, Uzbekistan, and Georgia. They intended to climb North Ridge. The final ascent started by Kaczkan and Urubko failed due to the destruction of the tent by harsh weather in camp IV and Kaczkan's cerebral edema.
 2011/2012 — Russian expedition. Nine Russian climbers attempted K2's Abruzzi Spur route. After their descent to base camp and an unsuccessful call for Gorelik's evacuation (helicopter could not reach them through the worsening weather), the climber died of pneumonia and cardiac arrest. Following the incident, the expedition was called off.
 2017/2018 — Polish National Winter Expedition led by Krzysztof Wielicki, consisting of 13 climbers, started in the end of December 2017. The team initially attempted to summit via the south-southeastern spur (Cesen route), switching to the Abruzzi Spur after an injury on the previous route.
 2021 —  Ten climbers from an international expedition made the first winter summit on 16 January 2021. The group all summited together, and consisted of Mingma Gyalje Sherpa, Nirmal Purja, Gelje Sherpa, Mingma David Sherpa, Mingma Tenzi Sherpa, Dawa Temba Sherpa, Pem Chhiri Sherpa, Kilu Pemba Sherpa, Dawa Tenjing Sherpa, and Sona Sherpa. The summiting group consisted entirely of indigenous climbers from Nepal. Nirmal Purja was the only one who reached the summit without the use of supplemental oxygen. On the same day Spanish team member Sergi Mingote died on the descent from Camp III; he fell somewhere between Camp I and Advanced Base Camp. Other famous climbers who died on the same expedition include Atanas Skatov, Ali Sadpara, and John Snorri.

Climbing routes and difficulties

There are a number of routes on K2, of somewhat different character, but they all share some key difficulties, the first being the extremely high altitude and resulting lack of oxygen: there is only one-third as much oxygen available to a climber on the summit of K2 as there is at sea level.
The second is the propensity of the mountain to experience extreme storms of several days duration, which have resulted in many of the deaths on the peak. The third is the steep, exposed, and committing nature of all routes on the mountain, which makes retreat more difficult, especially during a storm. Despite many attempts the first successful winter ascents occurred only in 2021. All major climbing routes lie on the Pakistani side. The base camp is also located on the Pakistani side.

Abruzzi Spur

The standard route of ascent, used by 75% of all climbers, is the Abruzzi Spur, located on the Pakistani side, first attempted by Prince Luigi Amedeo, Duke of the Abruzzi in 1909. This is the peak's southeast ridge, rising above the Godwin-Austen Glacier. The route follows an alternating series of rock ribs, snow/ice fields, and some technical rock climbing on two famous features, "House's Chimney" and the "Black Pyramid." Above the Black Pyramid, dangerously exposed and difficult to navigate slopes lead to the easily visible "Shoulder", and thence to the summit. The last major obstacle is a narrow couloir known as the "Bottleneck", which places climbers dangerously close to a wall of seracs that form an ice cliff to the east of the summit. It was partly due to the collapse of one of these seracs around 2001 that no climbers reached the summit in 2002 and 2003.

On 1 August 2008, 11 climbers from several expeditions died during a series of accidents, including several ice falls in the Bottleneck.

North Ridge

Almost opposite from the Abruzzi Spur is the North Ridge, which ascends the Chinese side of the peak. It is rarely climbed, partly due to very difficult access, involving crossing the Shaksgam River, which is a hazardous undertaking. In contrast to the crowds of climbers and trekkers at the Abruzzi basecamp, usually at most two teams are encamped below the North Ridge. This route, more technically difficult than the Abruzzi, ascends a long, steep, primarily rock ridge to high on the mountain—Camp IV, the "Eagle's Nest" at —and then crosses a dangerously slide-prone hanging glacier by a leftward climbing traverse, to reach a snow couloir which accesses the summit.

Besides the original Japanese ascent, a notable ascent of the North Ridge was the one in 1990 by Greg Child, Greg Mortimer, and Steve Swenson, which was done alpine style above Camp 2, though using some fixed ropes already put in place by a Japanese team.

Other routes

Because 75% of people who climb K2 use the Abruzzi Spur, these listed routes are rarely climbed. No one has climbed the East Face of the mountain due to the instability of the snow and ice formations on that side. Besides the East Face, the North Face has not yet been climbed either. In 2007 Denis Urubko and Serguey Samoilov intended to climb the K2's North Face but they were stymied by increasingly deteriorating conditions. After finding their intended route menaced by growing avalanche danger, they traversed onto the normal North Ridge route and summited on 2 October 2007, making the latest summer season ascent of the peak in history.

Northeast Ridge Long and corniced, finishes on uppermost part of Abruzzi route. Ridge first crossed by a Polish expedition led by Janusz Kurczab in 1976. The team was not able to summit due to poor weather. First climbed by Louis Reichardt and James Wickwire on 6 September 1978.

 West Ridge First climbed in 1981 by a Japanese team. This route starts on the distant Negrotto Glacier and goes through unpredictable bands of rock and snowfields.

 Southwest Pillar or "Magic Line" Very technical, and second most demanding. First climbed in 1986 by the Polish-Slovak trio Piasecki-Wróż-Božik. Since then Jordi Corominas from Spain has been the only successful climber on this route (he summitted in 2004), despite many other attempts.

 South Face or "Polish Line" or "Central Rib" Extremely exposed, demanding, and dangerous. In July 1986, Jerzy Kukuczka and Tadeusz Piotrowski summitted on this route. Piotrowski was killed while descending on the Abruzzi Spur. The route starts off the first part of the Southwest Pillar, and then deviates into a totally exposed, snow-covered cliff area, then through a gully known as "The Hockey Stick", and then goes up to yet another exposed cliff-face, and the route continues through yet another extremely exposed section all the way up to the point where the route joins with the Abruzzi Spur about  before the summit. Reinhold Messner called it a suicidal route and so far, no one has repeated Kukuczka and Piotrowski's achievement. "The route is so avalanche-prone, that no one else has ever considered a new attempt."

 Northwest Face First ascent via this route was in 1990 by a Japanese team; this route is located on the Chinese side of the mountain. This route is known for its chaotic rock and snowfields all the way up to the summit.

 Northwest Ridge First climbed in 1991 by a French team: Pierre Beghin and Christophe Profit. Finishes on North Ridge. Second attempt in 1995 by an American team, they reached 8100 metres the 2 August before turning back in deteriorating weather.

 South-southeast spur or "Cesen route" or "Basque route" It runs the pillar between the Abruzzi Spur and the Polish Route. It connects with the Abruzzi Spur on the Shoulder, above the Black Pyramid and below the Bottleneck; since it avoids the Black Pyramid, it is considered safer. In 1986, Tomo Česen ascended to  via this route. The first summit via this route was by a Basque team in 1994.

 West Face Technical difficulty at high altitude, first climbed by a Russian team in 2007. This route is almost entirely made up of rock crevasses and snow-covered couloirs.

Use of supplemental oxygen
For most of its climbing history, K2 was not usually climbed with supplemental oxygen, and small, relatively lightweight teams were the norm. However, the 2004 season saw a great increase in the use of oxygen: 28 of 47 summitteers used oxygen in that year.

Acclimatisation is essential when climbing without oxygen to avoid some degree of altitude sickness.
K2's summit is well above the altitude at which high altitude pulmonary edema (HAPE), or high altitude cerebral edema (HACE) can occur.

Films
 K2 (1991), an adventure drama film adaption of Patrick Meyers' original stage play, directed by Franc Roddam and loosely based on the story of Jim Wickwire and Louis Reichardt, the first Americans to summit K2
 Vertical Limit (2000), an American survival thriller film directed by Martin Campbell
 K2: Siren of the Himalayas (2012),  an American documentary film directed by Dave Ohlson, that follows a group of climbers during their 2009 attempt to summit K2 on the 100-year anniversary of the Duke of Abruzzi’s landmark K2 expedition in 1909
 The Summit (2012), a documentary film about the 2008 K2 disaster, directed by Nick Ryan
 K2: The Impossible Descent (2020), a documentary film about Polish ski mountaineer Andrzej Bargiel's 2018 K2 climb and descent on skis, directed by Sławomir Batyra and Steven Robillard

Disasters
 1986 K2 disaster
 1995 K2 disaster
 2008 K2 disaster

 Passes Windy Gap''' is a -high mountain pass  at east of K2, north of Broad Peak, and south of Skyang Kangri.

See also

 List of books about K2
 Concordia
 Gilgit–Baltistan
 The Himalayan Database
 Kangchenjunga (3rd highest after Everest and K2)
 List of deaths on eight-thousanders
 List of highest mountains
 List of Mount Everest death statistics
 List of mountains in Pakistan
 List of peaks by prominence
 List of people who died climbing Mount Everest
 List of tallest mountains in the Solar System
 Mount Hood climbing accidents
 Trans-Karakoram Tract
 

Notes

References

 Bibliography 
 
 
 

External links

 Himalaya-Info.org page on K2 (German)
The climbing history of K2 from the first attempt in 1902 until the Italian success in 1954.
   From Everest-K2 Posters
 
 
 Map of K2
 List of ascents to December 2007
 'K2: The Killing Peak' Men's Journal November 2008 feature
 Achille Compagnoni —Daily Telegraph obituary
 Dr Charles Houston —Daily Telegraph'' obituary
 k2climb.net

 
China–Pakistan border
Eight-thousanders of the Karakoram
Highest points of Chinese provinces
International mountains of Asia
Kashgar Prefecture
Mountains of Gilgit-Baltistan
Seven Second Summits
Articles containing video clips
Highest points of countries
Mountaineering deaths
National symbols of Pakistan
Shigar District